Salmanabad may refer to:
Salmanabad, Ardabil
Salmanabad, Savalan, Ardabil Province
Salmanabad, Marvdasht, Fars Province
Salmanabad, Anbarabad, Kerman Province
Salmanabad, Rigan, Kerman Province
Salmanabad, Razavi Khorasan
Salmanabad, Fashapuyeh, a village in Fashapuyeh District, Rey County, Tehran Province
Salmanabad, Kahrizak, a village in Kahrizak District, Rey County, Tehran Province
Salmanabad, Varamin, a village in Varamin County, Tehran Province
Salmanabad, West Azerbaijan